Sir George Gibson Mitcheson  (27 June 1883 – 18 June 1955) was a British solicitor and Conservative Party politician. He served as the Member of Parliament (MP) for St Pancras South West from 1931 until 1945 and the President of the National Chamber of Trade for the British Chamber of Commerce.

Biography
Mitcheson was born in Heckmondwike, Yorkshire, the son of solicitor Thomas Mitcheson. He was educated privately and articled to his father.

Career 
In 1932, he was made the President of the National Chamber of Trade for the British Chamber of Commerce.

Mitcheson ran for the seat of St Pancras South West in 1931, defeating the current MP, William Carter in a landslide that saw him win a 25.8% swing, one the largest constituency swing from Labour to the Conservatives. He would then hold his seat against James Edmond Sears in the 1935 Election, albeit with a significantly reduced majority, down from around 11,000 in 1931 to only 2,400 in 1935. Then, in the 1936 New Year Honours, Mitcheson was made a Knight Bachelor for political and public services by George V. Even after he ceased to be an MP, he would continue to play a role in politics all the way until 1943 when he finally retired from politics completely.

He died at home in London, aged 71.

References

External links 
 
 

1883 births
1955 deaths
People from Heckmondwike
Conservative Party (UK) MPs for English constituencies
UK MPs 1931–1935
UK MPs 1935–1945
Knights Bachelor
20th-century British lawyers